Zinzahal (also spelled Zinzagal) is a village and municipality in the Dashkasan Rayon of Azerbaijan.  It has a population of 805.  The municipality consists of the villages of Zinzahal, Almalı, Kollu, Suqovuşan, and Yolqullar.

References 

Populated places in Dashkasan District